Georg Tischler (born 11 September 1961) is a Paralympic athlete from Austria competing in seated throwing events. He is classified F54.

Tischler set the F54 World Record for shot put in 2009.

He has competed at four consecutive Paralympics starting in 2000 and has always competed in the shot put and discus as well as the javelin in 2000.  His only medal so far came in Athens in 2004 where he won gold in the F54 shot put. He reached the finals but did not medal at the 2012 Summer Paralympics in London.

References

External links
 

Paralympic athletes of Austria
Athletes (track and field) at the 2000 Summer Paralympics
Athletes (track and field) at the 2004 Summer Paralympics
Athletes (track and field) at the 2008 Summer Paralympics
Athletes (track and field) at the 2012 Summer Paralympics
Paralympic gold medalists for Austria
World record holders in Paralympic athletics
Austrian male shot putters
Austrian male discus throwers
1961 births
Living people
Medalists at the 2004 Summer Paralympics
Paralympic medalists in athletics (track and field)
Wheelchair shot putters
Wheelchair discus throwers
Paralympic shot putters
Paralympic discus throwers
21st-century Austrian people